Jean Louis Thevenet (senior) (1705 - ca. 1778) was a French porcelain painter active from 1741 to 1777. Formerly a fanmaker, he painted flowers, both singular and in bunches. His early work included painting on porcelain in the studio of Louis François Gravant. He worked at Manufacture de Vincennes (1741) before joining Sèvres in 1756 where he was known as No. 121. His mark resembles a pin, although it has also been illustrated as a comma or musical note. He was known to still have painted in 1778, and to have had a daughter who also painted for Sèvres.

Selected works in public collections
1764, ointment jars, Sèvres porcelain, polychrome decoration, Museum of Fine Arts, Boston
1767, bone china cup and saucer, Clark Art Institute
1768, cup and saucer from the Manufacture de Vincennes, Musée des Arts Décoratifs, Paris
Sugar pot, Walters Art Museum

Notes

References

1705 births
1778 deaths
18th-century French painters
French male painters
Porcelain painters
18th-century French male artists